The Sports University of Tirana (UST) is a university in Albania that trains fitness teachers and sports specialists, sport and tourism managers, guides, and physical education teachers. It awards Masters and PhD programs.

The academy started in 1960 with special Decree of the Council of Ministers Nr. 394, dated 28 September 1960. One year later it was named Vojo Kushi.

The university has these faculties:

Fakulteti i Shkencave të Lëvizjes
Fakulteti i Veprimtarisë Fizike dhe Rekreacionit
Fakulteti i Shkencave të Rehabilitimit
Instituti i Kërkimit Shkencor të Sportit

See also
List of universities in Albania
Quality Assurance Agency of Higher Education
List of colleges and universities
List of colleges and universities by country

References

Universities in Albania
Educational institutions established in 1960
1960 establishments in Albania
Buildings and structures in Tirana